Critical Social Policy is a quarterly peer-reviewed academic journal that publishes articles in the field of political science. The journal was established in 1981.

Abstracting and indexing 
Critical Social Policy is abstracted and indexed in Scopus and the Social Sciences Citation Index. According to the Journal Citation Reports, its 2013 impact factor is 1.297, ranking it 15th out of 93 in Social Sciences, Interdisciplinary; and 10th out of 42 in the category "Social Issues".

References

External links
 

Political science journals
Quarterly journals
English-language journals
SAGE Publishing academic journals
Publications established in 1981
Sociology journals